Stephanopoulos is a Greek surname. Notable people with the surname include:

 Andreas Stephanopoulos (1860–1938), Greek politician
 Christos Stephanopoulos (1853–1918), Greek politician
 Costis Stephanopoulos (1926-2016), Greek politician, President of Greece
 George Stephanopoulos (born 1961), Greek-American journalist and political adviser
 Georgios Stephanopoulos (born 1962) Greek boxer
 Maria Flytzani-Stephanopoulos (1950–2019) American chemical engineer
 Stefanos Stephanopoulos (1898–1982), Greek politician, Prime Minister of Greece

Greek-language surnames
Surnames
Patronymic surnames